Auchterhouse Hill is the second highest hill of the Sidlaw range in South East Angus.   At , it is classified as a Tump with a relative height of 81 metres. Auchterhouse Hill is located near Auchterhouse and is higher than Balkello Hill and is smaller than nearby Craigowl Hill. There is an ancient hill fort on the summit.

The annual Auchterhouse Hill Race takes place in March.

References

Mountains and hills of Angus, Scotland